Matteo Lane (born June 28, 1986) is an American comedian.

Early life and education 
Matteo Lane was born in 1986, raised in Arlington Heights, Illinois, and lived on the  North Side. Through his mother, Lane is of Mexican and Italian descent. His father is a Vietnam War veteran and is of Irish descent. Lane's Italian family originates from Agrigento and Messina in Sicily. He was nicknamed Matteo by his Italian family. Lane, who is gay, has an older brother who is also gay. He speaks English, Italian, Spanish, and French, and studied German in high school. Lane started to sing opera at the age of 15 under vocal coach Nick Falco. At the School of the Art Institute of Chicago, he studied oil painting and drawing. Lane studied art for five months in Umbria as an oil painter and opera singer before returning to Chicago.

Career 
As a singer, Lane performed in bars in Boystown before starting his comedy career circa 2011 at open mics in Chicago. He moved to New York to work as a storyboard artist circa 2012. In an interview, Lane stated that it was "the most boring job in the world." He later quit the position to pursue comedy. After being featured in "New Faces" at the 2014 Just for Laughs festival, MTV invited Lane to appear on Guy Code. He was later in Joking Off and was cast in MTV's Ladylike along with Nicole Byer, Jade Catta-Preta, and Blair Socci. Lane was on a panel for a segment about Kim Davis on The Nightly Show with Larry Wilmore. In 2018, Lane represented Italy at "The Ethnic Show" at the Just For Laughs festival in Montreal. He is the host of the Snapchat comedy Ghost Hunt.

Lane is an advocate for the gay community. He has been the victim of several homophobic incidents during his shows. On being an openly gay comedian, Lane reports, "I think it's slowly getting better but it's all such new territory in so many ways. I'm not saying they are not gay comics that have existed — I know these people exist”. He added that "I'm just saying this is the first time ever that gay, queer, male comedians are sort of on the spotlight that straight comedians are being seen in. So it's all kind of just new. It's all new and discovered and all new territory. I think it's exciting."

His favorite performance venues in New York City are Comedy Cellar, The Stand, and New York Comedy Club. He is a co-star and creator of the IFC series Janice and Jeffrey.

Lane and Emma Willmann are co-hosts of a queer-themed podcast, Inside the Closet. They are both also featured in Netflix's The Comedy Lineup. On May 1, 2018, Lane and Nico Tortorella were featured on a Nancy podcast.

Personal life 
On coming out, Lane stated in an interview that "I've spent my entire life feeling shame for being gay and once I came out of the closet, I realized that I'm proud to be gay." Lane's favorite singers are Mariah Carey, Patti LaBelle, Whitney Houston, Celine Dion, and Jennifer Hudson. He is a long-time friend of composer and pianist Henry Koperski, with whom he sometimes performs.

Political views 
In a 2017 interview, Lane stated that while he does not discuss Donald Trump directly in his acts, his "material in itself is a stand against Trump."

Awards and honors 
In 2018, Lane was recognized by The Advocate as one of the LGBT Icons, Innovators, and Disruptors for his work in the field of stand-up comedy.

See also
 LGBT culture in New York City
 List of LGBT people from New York City

References

External links 
 
 

1986 births
Living people
Male actors from Chicago
Comedians from Illinois
People from Arlington Heights, Illinois
American gay artists
American gay actors
American gay musicians
Gay comedians
Gay singers
Gay painters
LGBT people from Illinois
American male actors of Mexican descent
American people of Italian descent
School of the Art Institute of Chicago alumni
American LGBT singers
American LGBT comedians
American LGBT painters
21st-century American male singers
21st-century American painters
21st-century American male artists
Painters from Illinois
Singers from Illinois
American storyboard artists
American people of Irish descent
21st-century American comedians
20th-century LGBT people
21st-century LGBT people